Robert J. Nichols (July 10, 1930 – March 30, 2013) was an American college basketball coach. He was known for his tenure as the head men’s coach for the University of Toledo.

Nichols was born in Grand Haven, Michigan and raised in Jackson, Michigan. He played college basketball for Toledo from 1950 to 1953. He was hired as head coach for Central Catholic High School in Toledo in 1956, and in seven seasons as head coach compiled a record of 111–39. He then entered the college coaching ranks, first as an assistant at Bowling Green, and then was hired as an assistant coach at his alma mater in 1964. Nichols was promoted to head coach after head coach Ed Melvin resigned following the 1964–65 season.

He coached Toledo for 22 seasons, compiling a record of 377 and 211. His teams won five Mid-American Conference (MAC) championships and the 1980 MAC tournament title. Nichols compiled twenty consecutive winning seasons, but resigned in 1987 after consecutive losing seasons.

Nichols returned to coaching in 1989, where he first accepted the head coach position at Lake–Sumter Community College, but then reversed course and accepted the head women’s job at Eckerd College. Nichols coached at Eckerd for five seasons, resigning to take care of his wife after she was in a serious car accident.

Nichols died in Toledo on March 30, 2013 at age 82.

References

External links
 Coaching record @ sports-reference.com

1930 births
2013 deaths
American men's basketball coaches
American men's basketball players
American women's basketball coaches
Basketball coaches from Michigan
Basketball players from Michigan
Bowling Green Falcons men's basketball coaches
College men's basketball head coaches in the United States
High school basketball coaches in the United States
People from Grand Haven, Michigan
Sportspeople from Jackson, Michigan
Toledo Rockets men's basketball coaches
Toledo Rockets men's basketball players